Jir Gavaber or Jir Gavabar or Jirgavabar or Jirgovaber may refer to:
 Jir Gavaber, Amlash
 Jir Gavabar, Lahijan